Zubrzyk  (Zubryk) is a village in the administrative district of Gmina Piwniczna-Zdrój, within Nowy Sącz County, Lesser Poland Voivodeship, in southern Poland, close to the border with Slovakia.

References

Villages in Nowy Sącz County